Quantum Computation and Quantum Information is a textbook about quantum information science written by Michael Nielsen and Isaac Chuang, regarded as a standard text on the subject. It is informally known as "Mike and Ike", after the candies of that name. The book assumes minimal prior experience with quantum mechanics and with computer science, aiming instead to be a self-contained introduction to the relevant features of both. (Lov Grover recalls a postdoc disparaging it with the remark, "The book is too elementary – it starts off with the assumption that the reader does not even know quantum mechanics.") The focus of the text is on theory, rather than the experimental implementations of quantum computers, which are discussed more briefly.

, the book has been cited over 39,000 times on Google Scholar. In 2019, Nielsen adapted parts of the book for his Quantum Country project.

Table of Contents (Tenth Anniversary Edition) 
 Chapter 1: Introduction and Overview
 Chapter 2: Introduction to Quantum Mechanics
 Chapter 3: Introduction to Computer Science
 Chapter 4: Quantum Circuits
 Chapter 5: The Quantum Fourier Transform and its Applications
 Chapter 6: Quantum Search Algorithms
 Chapter 7: Quantum Computers: Physical Realization
 Chapter 8: Quantum Noise and Quantum Operations
 Chapter 9: Distance Measures for Quantum Information
 Chapter 10: Quantum Error-Correction
 Chapter 11: Entropy and Information
 Chapter 12: Quantum Information Theory
 Appendix 1: Notes on Basic Probability Theory
 Appendix 2: Group Theory
 Appendix 3: The Solovay–Kitaev Theorem
 Appendix 4: Number Theory
 Appendix 5: Public Key Cryptography and the RSA Cryptosystem
 Appendix 6: Proof of Lieb's Theorem
 Bibliography
 Index

Reviews 
Peter Shor called the text "an excellent book". Lov Grover called it "the bible of the quantum information field". Scott Aaronson said about it, Mike and Ike' as it's affectionately called, remains the quantum computing textbook to which all others are compared." David DiVincenzo said, "More than any of the previous attempts, this book has identified the essential foundations of quantum information theory with a clarity that has even, in a few cases, permitted the authors to obtain some original results and point toward new research directions." A review in the November 2001 edition of Foundations of Physics says, "Among the handful of books that have been written on this new subject, the present volume is the most complete and comprehensive."

Editions

References 

2000 non-fiction books
2010 non-fiction books
Cambridge University Press books
Computer science books
Physics textbooks
Quantum computing